Chungo Creek is a large creek close to Nordegg in Western Alberta, Canada. It starts at a mountain lake called Upper Mons Lake, and eventually empties into the Blackstone River (Alberta).

Chungo is a word derived from the Stoney language meaning "trail".

Tributaries
Seepage Creek
Mons Creek
Upper Hansen Creek
Dorothy Creek
Clark Creek

Fish species
The most common fish of the Chungo Creek is the bull trout. There is also westslope cutthroat, brook and brown trout and a small population of mountain whitefish further down the creek.

See also
List of Alberta rivers

References

Rivers of Alberta